Mercury(II) stearate is a metal-organic compound, a salt of mercury and stearic acid with the chemical formula . The compound is classified as a metallic soap, i.e. a metal derivative of a fatty acid. The compound is highly toxic by inhalation, ingestion, and skin absorption.

Synthesis
An exchange reaction of sodium stearate and mercury dichloride:

Also, heating mercurious oxide with stearic acid.

Physical properties
The compound forms yellow waxy substance.

Soluble in fatty oils; insoluble in water or alcohol.

Uses
The compound is used as a germicide.

Also as a plasticizer in the production of ceramics.

References

Stearates
Mercury compounds